Garden Cities of To-morrow is a book by the British urban planner Ebenezer Howard. When it was published in 1898, the book was titled To-morrow: A Peaceful Path to Real Reform. In 1902 it was reprinted as Garden Cities of To-Morrow.  The book gave rise to the garden city movement and is very important in the field of urban design.

Background
This book offered a vision of towns free of slums and enjoying the benefits of both town (such as opportunity, amusement and high wages) and country (such as beauty, fresh air and low rents). Howard illustrated the idea with his "Three Magnets" diagram. His ideas were conceived for the context of a capitalist economic system, and sought to balance individual and community needs.

Two English towns were built as garden cities, Letchworth and Welwyn.  Though they did not completely measure up to the ideal, they provided a model for controlling urban sprawl.

Diagrams from the 1898 edition

Diagrams from the 1902 edition

Diagrams from the 1922 edition

Notes

References
Larry Anderson. Benton MacKaye: Conservationist, Planner, and creator of the Appalachian Trail. Baltimore:  The Johns Hopkins University Press. 2002.
Ebenezer Howard. Garden Cities of Tomorrow. London: S. Sonnenschein & Co., Ltd. 1902. (at Google Books)
Sacred-Texts.com. Garden Cities of Tomorrow (HTML edition with introduction).

1898 non-fiction books
British non-fiction books
Books about urbanism